The Jean-Pierre River is a tributary of the Jean-Pierre Bay, on the south shore of the Gouin Reservoir, flowing into the territory
of the town of La Tuque, into the administrative region of Mauricie, in Quebec, in Canada.

The Jean-Pierre River flows successively into the townships of Dansereau, Bureau and Leblanc, south of the Gouin Reservoir and on the west side of the upper
Saint-Maurice River. Forestry is the main economic activity of this valley; recreational tourism activities, second.

The route 405, connecting the Gouin Dam to the village of Wemotaci, Quebec by the west bank of the Saint-Maurice River, serves
Some secondary forest roads are in use nearby for forestry and recreational tourism activities.

The surface of the Jean-Pierre River is usually frozen from mid-November to the end of April, however, safe ice circulation is generally from early December to
late March.

Geography

Toponymy 
The term "Jean-Pierre" is a first name of French origin.

The toponym "Rivière Jean-Pierre" was officialized on December 5, 1968 at the Commission de toponymie du Québec.

Notes and references

See also 

Rivers of Mauricie
Tributaries of the Saint-Maurice River
La Tuque, Quebec